St. Petersburg is a city in Pinellas County, Florida, United States. As of the 2020 census, the population was 258,308, making it the fifth-most populous city in Florida and the second-largest city in the Tampa Bay Area, after Tampa. It is the largest city in the state that is not a county seat (the city of Clearwater is the seat of Pinellas County). Along with Clearwater, these cities are part of the Tampa–St. Petersburg–Clearwater Metropolitan Statistical Area, the second-largest in Florida with a population of around 2.8 million. St. Petersburg is on the Pinellas peninsula between Tampa Bay and the Gulf of Mexico, and is connected to mainland Florida to the north.

Locals often refer to the city as St. Pete. Neighboring St. Pete Beach formally shortened its name in 1994 after a vote by its residents. St. Petersburg is governed by a mayor and city council.

With an average of 361 days of sunshine annually, and a Guinness World Record for the most consecutive days of sunshine (768 days between 1967 and 1969), it is nicknamed "The Sunshine City." Due to its good weather, the city has long been a popular retirement destination, although in recent years the population has moved in a much more youthful direction.

History

Early Spanish exploration
When the Spanish first arrived in the area of Tampa Bay, they encountered people of the Safety Harbor culture. About 20 sites with temple mounds have been found around Tampa Bay, with several in Pinellas County. Best known of the Safety Harbor people was the chiefdom of Tocobaga, which was likely located at the Safety Harbor site in Philippe Park in northern Pinellas County. The Pánfilo de Narváez expedition landed on the shores of Boca Ciega Bay at the Jungle Prada Site on April 14, 1528. It was the first inland exploration of North America. Of 300 men on the expedition only four survived. One of the survivors of the expedition, Álvar Núñez Cabeza de Vaca, wrote the first book describing the peoples, wildlife, flora and fauna of inland North America in his Relacion, published in Spain in 1542.

Nineteenth century

The city was co-founded by John C. Williams, formerly of Detroit, who purchased the land in 1875, and by Peter Demens, who was instrumental in bringing the terminus of the Orange Belt Railway there in 1888. St. Petersburg was incorporated as a town on February 29, 1892, when it had a population of 300 people.

Local lore claims John C. Williams and Peter Demens flipped a coin to see who would have the honor of naming the city. When Demens won the coin toss the city was named after Saint Petersburg, Russia, where Peter Demens had spent half of his youth, while John C. Williams named the first hotel after his birthplace, Detroit (a hotel built by Demens). The Detroit Hotel still exists downtown on Central Ave, but has been turned into a condominium.

The oldest operating hotels are the Pier Hotel (formally Hotel Cordova), built in 1921, and The Exchange Hotel (formalley The Heritage Hotel), built in 1926.

The first major newspaper to debut in Tampa Bay was the St. Petersburg Times which established in 1884. Philadelphia publisher F. A. Davis turned on St. Petersburg's first electrical service in 1897. The city's first major industry was born in 1899 when Henry W. Hibbs (1862–1942), a native of Newport, North Carolina, established his wholesale fish business at the end of the railroad pier, which extended out to the shipping channel.

Twentieth century 

St. Petersburg was incorporated as a city in June 1903. With this transition, the development of the downtown waterfront had dredging of a deeper shipping channel from 1906 to 1908 which opened St. Petersburg to larger shipping. Further dredging improved the port facilities through the 1910s. By then the city's population had quadrupled to a population of 4,127 citizens. F. A. Davis was instrumental to bringing the first trolley service in 1904.

In 1914, Al Lang invited the St. Louis Browns to move their spring training into the city, then worked tirelessly to make Grapefruit League training in and around St. Petersburg the destination for baseball teams and their fans by the 1920s. Lang eventually became mayor and ambassador for the city, and helped its permanent population grow tenfold in just a decade.

St. Petersburg's first library opened on December 1, 1915, which still operates to this day as the Mirror Lake Library.

In 1914 an airplane service across Tampa Bay from St. Petersburg to Tampa and back was initiated, generally considered the first scheduled commercial airline flight. The flight took former mayor Abe Pheil to Tampa. The company name was the St. Petersburg-Tampa Airboat Line, and the pilot was Tony Jannus flying a Benoist XIV flying boat. The Tony Jannus Award is presented annually for outstanding achievement in the airline industry.

The city and its tourism industry burgeoned in the 1920s, with up to a quarter million visitors annually coming from Canada, the North and the Midwest by automobile, yacht, and railroad. The city was the principal Gulf Coast destination for long-distance trains of the Atlantic Coast Line Railroad's Southland (from Chicago and Cincinnati) and Gulf Coast Limited (from New York, succeeded by the West Coast Champion), and Seaboard Air Line Railroad trains such as the Southern States Special (from New York, succeeded by the Silver Meteor). Travel time from across the bay was cut due to the Gandy Bridge's opening in 1924, allowing direct access to Tampa and the rest of central Florida.

The city took on a Mediterranean flair, with Old Spanish Trail style architecture promoted by Snell Isle founder Perry Snell, whose new country club island homes adopted many elements of Moorish design. Those same elements were echoed in the city's new Vinoy, Jungle Country Club, Don Cesar and other fine hotels, as well as in Snell's new skyscraper office building downtown. The 1926 opening of the Million Dollar Pier marked the peak of the boom, adding an attraction that brought both tourists and townspeople together to enjoy fishing, amusements, trolley access and even a local radio station.

The St. Petersburg flag was created in 1927 and was designed by Mayor C.J. Maurer along with a committee of other public officials. It featured an array of colors symbolic of St. Pete's culture including the sunshine, water and land. The idea came after officials called for a new logo which later became the design for the flag. The pelican featured in the center became a symbol for the "Feed the Pelican Fund" which has supported the birds during the winter months.

Tourism declined by the late 1920s and early 1930s due to the Great Depression. The city recovered later in the 1930s with the help of the Public Works Administration, including a $10 million investment plan in 1939 which helped build the St. Petersburg City Hall. The second World War brought renewed growth, as the city's Bayboro Harbor became a training base for the U.S. Coast Guard and the Army Air Force chose the city as their technical service training station. The hotels filled for the first time in years, as up to 100,000 troops came to St. Petersburg. After the war, many of those troops who were stationed in St. Petersburg returned as residents or tourists.
In the 1950s, St. Petersburg experienced another population boom, with the return of retiree resettlement to the city. In 1954 the original Sunshine Skyway Bridge opened its first span to link St. Petersburg with Manatee County, connecting the next year to U.S. Route 19 in the city. With a large influx of car traffic, it was decided to remove the city's streetcar lines.

The development of major transportation continued into the 1960s with the completion of the Howard Frankland Bridge in 1960, creating another connection between St. Petersburg and Tampa. St. Petersburg also received its first stadium named the Bayfront Center which hosted the first professional hockey league in Tampa Bay. A new municipal marina and the Museum of Fine Arts were also built downtown. St. Petersburg is home to one of the world's largest reclaimed water systems that was built in the 1970s which flows 37 million gallons of water per day to provide for customers located throughout the city.

From May to August 1968, 211 of the city's sanitation workers struck for higher wages. The strike began approximately one month after Martin Luther King, Jr.'s assassination in Memphis, Tennessee while supporting that city's sanitation workers strike.

In 1984, a full-scale flying replica of the Benoist XIV flying boat was constructed by Florida Aviation Historical Society for the 70th anniversary of the flight. This aircraft is now on loan to the St. Petersburg Museum of History in St. Petersburg, Florida.

Contemporary history 
Development of the first Major League Baseball team to be located in the Tampa Bay area began in St. Petersburg throughout the 1970s. The city tried to encourage numerous teams through the United States to make St. Petersburg their new home. Designs for a ballpark were first presented in 1983 and construction for a permanent dome stadium began in 1986. The stadium opened in 1990 as the Florida Suncoast Dome, renamed the Thunderdome in 1993. After many attempts to attract tenants to the new stadium, Major League Baseball gave St. Petersburg a franchise in 1995. In 1996, the dome was renamed a third time to Tropicana Field after naming rights were established with Tropicana Dole Beverages. The Tampa Bay Devil Rays was then established in 1998 after the stadium's renovation and the new team played their first game on March 31, 1998, giving the Tampa Bay area their first professional baseball team.

The city population continued to multiply during the 20th century, booming through the 1970s as a popular retirement destination for Americans from midwestern cities, reaching 238,647 in the 1980 census. Serious urban problems and destruction of historic structures stymied growth in the subsequent decade and a half, but renewed interest in urban living by family aged residents and the expansion of the downtown university and related services has renewed its growth.

Geography

Topography

St. Petersburg is bordered by Tampa Bay's three sections, Old, Middle and Lower Tampa Bay.

Downtown

Downtown St. Petersburg is the Central Business District, containing high rises for office use. The Tampa Bay Times newspaper is headquartered in the downtown area. The Poynter Institute, which owns the paper, is located on 3rd Street South.

The Mahaffey Theater complex, the Morean Arts Center, dozens of other art galleries, Haslam's Bookstore, The Coliseum, Palladium Theatre, and Jannus Live are among the galleries and cultural venues featured downtown. Several prominent museums are located in the perimeter. Many of them have received notable accolades, including the Chihuly Collection presented by the Morean Arts Center, the Museum of Fine Arts, the Salvador Dalí Museum, the now-closed Florida International Museum, the St. Petersburg Museum of History, Florida Holocaust Museum, and the James Museum of Western and Wildlife Art. The city hosts many outdoor festivals throughout the year.

St. Petersburg's downtown has been rated among the best in the South. The area's beaches are a  drive from downtown.

Jutting a half mile into the bay was the St. Petersburg Pier, a major tourist attraction that offered various activities. "The Lens" design which was chosen by the International Design Competition Jury and accepted by City Council later had its contract terminated by a citywide election during the summer of 2013. Following this, the "Pier Park" was chosen out of the 16 new design teams that submitted work in late 2014 and in 2015 the Pier Park was set for construction in early 2017. The new Pier District opened on July 6, 2020, and contains green space, the Marketplace, playground, splash pad, and several public art installations, including Janet Echelman's aerial net sculpture, Bending Art.

Downtown also contains the University of South Florida St. Petersburg and a downtown branch of St. Petersburg College. The downtown perimeter includes several parks, most of which are waterfront or lakefront. Straub Park is nearly a half mile long, boasts a waterfront location, and is home of the St. Petersburg Museum of Fine Arts. Because of the number of parks in the downtown area, The Trust for Public Land ranks St. Petersburg 1st in Florida and 15th out of 100 of the largest cities in the U.S. The Vinoy Park Hotel has a bayfront location, a spot on the National Register of Historic Places, and an AAA Four-Diamond rating. It fronts Vinoy Park, which holds music festivals, including the Warped Tour. Nearby is the historic Tramor Cafeteria building, now part of the Tampa Bay Times. The city is connected via the Looper Trolley.

Most of the dining and nightlife can be found downtown on or near Central Avenue or Beach Drive along the waterfront. Venues include Jannus Live and the State Theatre. The active nightlife scene is credited to recent demographic and regulatory changes. In 2010, the city council voted to extend bar hours until 3 A.M., identical to cross-bay "rival" Tampa.

Tropicana Field, home of Major League Baseball's Tampa Bay Rays, is located in the western part of downtown. Until 2008, the team played its spring training games at nearby Progress Energy Park. This setup was unique, making St. Petersburg the first city that played host to its baseball team during spring training as well as the regular season since the 1919 Philadelphia Athletics. At the end of 2007, there was a debate over a new stadium to be built on the downtown waterfront at the current Progress Energy Park site. Tropicana Field would be demolished and replaced with prime residential and retail space. Completion of the stadium was planned for 2012; however, the proposal has been tabled indefinitely while a community-based organization investigates all alternatives for new stadium construction.

St. Petersburg has the third-largest dedicated public waterfront park system in North America, with a waterfront park system that stretches  and is used year-round for public events, festivals and other activities. In the early 20th century, citizens and city leaders engaged in a long and boisterous debate over the future of the young city's waterfront space, with one side advocating for commercial, port and industrial development and the other side advocating for a long-term commitment to parks and public access to the waterfront. The public access and park contingent won the debate when, on Christmas Eve 1909, the city announced the acquisition of the waterfront land that is encompassed by the waterfront park system.

The city is also becoming one of the largest destinations in Florida for kiteboarding with locations such as Fort De Soto Park, Pass-a-Grille, and Ten-Cent.

The St. Petersburg Shuffleboard Club was established in 1924 and gained attention as the "World's Largest Shuffleboard Club" with 110 courts and over 5,000 members in the 1950s and 1960s.

Northshore Aquatic Complex is a public pool and small water park located downtown on the St. Petersburg waterfront. Northshore contains a 50-meter pool with diving board, 25 meter training pool with zero depth entry, a play pool, and is home to both Saint Petersburg Aquatics swim club and Saint Petersburg Masters swim club.

Cityscape

Neighborhoods
St. Petersburg is home to more than 100 neighborhoods, with most of the historic districts located near the bay. On the central Eastern edge of the city is Downtown St. Petersburg, which includes the city's residential and commercial skyscrapers, art galleries, museums, and parks.

The downtown area is home to the central business district and to many start-up companies, corporate branches, banks, law firms, and restaurants. Apart from downtown's business and cultural offerings, the area also includes a branch of St. Petersburg College and the campus of the University of South Florida-St. Petersburg. The downtown district is home to two professional sports teams, the Tampa Bay Rays, which play in the western part of downtown at Tropicana Field, and the Tampa Bay Rowdies, which play along the downtown waterfront at Al Lang Stadium.

North of downtown lie the Historic Old Northeast and Snell Isle, which both have Mediterranean style historic and waterfront homes, parks, and recreational areas. Old Northeast is home to a shopping district, city landmarks, beaches, and small shops as well as small residential high rises. Snell Isle was founded by C. Perry Snell who bought up the land to develop upscale properties in the 1900s, and helped create some of St. Petersburg's resorts such as the Vinoy Park Hotel and the St. Petersburg Woman's Club, both of which are listed on the U.S. National Register of Historic Places. The far north consists of the Gateway area which overlaps part of Pinellas Park, home to major employers such as Home Shopping Network and currently the site of much construction of residential and business buildings and of new toll roads.

The central portion of St. Petersburg includes the Grand Central District and Historic Kenwood. The Grand Central District houses the city's cafes, art galleries, restaurants, and bars all owing to the Craftsman style architecture. Historic Kenwood is filled with art studios and galleries similarly to the Grand Central District.

South of downtown is Historic Roser Park, which houses historic Mediterranean and Eclectic style housing, parks, and museums. The neighborhood is divided by Booker Creek which flows into Bayboro Harbor.

In far western St. Petersburg, north of the separate city of South Pasadena, Florida, is the neighborhood of Pasadena, which includes the intersection of State Road 693 (Pasadena Avenue) and County Road 150 (Central Avenue).

Climate

St. Petersburg has a humid subtropical climate (Köppen Cfa) with some characteristics of a tropical monsoon climate (Am), with a defined rainy season from June through September. Many portions of St. Petersburg, especially along the bay and in south St. Petersburg, have tropical microclimates due to the maritime influence of the Gulf of Mexico and Tampa Bay. As a result, tropical flora like coconut palms and royal palms can be found throughout the city, and the city is home to the Gizella Kopsick Palm Arboretum, a  park which houses over 500 palms and cycads, including a pair of large Jamaican Tall coconut palms which predate the freeze of 1989. St. Petersburg, like the rest of the Tampa Bay area, is occasionally affected by tropical storms and hurricanes. However, the last time a hurricane directly struck the city was in 1946.

Demographics

2010 Census

According to the 2010 census, the city contained 244,769 people, making St. Petersburg the largest city in Pinellas County, and 129,401 households.

The racial makeup of St. Petersburg was 168,036 (68.7%) White, 58,577 (23.9%) African American, 7,779 (3.2%) Asian (0.8% Vietnamese, 0.5% Filipino, 0.5% Indian, 0.3% Chinese, 0.1% Korean, 0.1% Japanese, and 1.0% Other Asian), 723 (0.3%) Native American, 135 (0.1%) Pacific Islander, 3,474 (1.4%) from other races, and 6,045 (2.5%) from two or more races. Hispanic or Latino people of any race numbered 16,214 (6.6%), with 5,272 (2.2%) Puerto Rican, 2,855 (1.2%) Mexican, 2,835 (1.2%) Cuban, and other Hispanic or Latino people making up 5,252 (2.1%) of the population.

With the city having 129,401 households, 108,815 (84.1%) were occupied while 20,586 (15.9%) were not occupied. With 108,815 of the population in households, 3,888 (1.6%) lived in non-institutionalized group-quarters and 2,719 (1.1%) were institutionalized. There were 108,815 households, out of which 23,304 (21.4%) had children under the age of 18 living in them, 37,847 (34.8%) were opposite-sex married couples living together, 16,425 (15.1%) had a female householder with no husband present, 4,849 (4.5%) had a male householder with no wife present. There were 9,453 (3.9%) unmarried partnerships. 39,397 households (36.2%) were made up of individuals, and 28,267 (26.0%) had someone living alone who was 65 years of age or older. The average household size was 2.19. Out of 108,815 occupied households, families made up 59,121 (54.3%) while non-families made up 49,694 (45.7%); the average family size was 2.88. The median age of the city was 41.6 years.

2000 Census

As of 2000, 23.85% of households had children under the age of 18 living with them, 37.295% were married couples living together, 13.8% had a female householder with no adult living partner present, and 43.8% were non-families. 35.6% of all households were made up of individuals, and 13.3% had someone living alone who was 65 years of age or older. The average household size was 2.10 and the average family size was 2.865.

In 2000, the city's population was spread out, with 21.5% under the age of 18, 7.7% from 18 to 24, 30.2% from 25 to 44, 23.1% from 45 to 64, and 17.4% who were 65 years of age or older. The median age was 39.24 years. For every 100 females, there were 91.2 males. For every 100 females age 18 and over, there were 87.7 males.

As of 2000, the median income for a household in the city was $34,597, and the median income for a family was $43,198. Males had a median income of $30,794 versus $27,860 for females. The per capita income for the city was $21,107. About 9.2% of families and 13.3% of the population were below the poverty line, including 19.1% of those under age 18 and 10.8% of those age 65 or over. In 2010, 17.8% of the population was under the poverty line, including 32.2% of those under age 18 and 14.1% of those age 65 or over.

Languages

As of 2000, those who spoke only English at home accounted were 88.53% of residents, Spanish was spoken by 4.43%, German by 0.78%, French by 0.72% of speakers, Vietnamese by 0.67%, Serbo-Croatian by 0.52%, and Laotian by 0.51% of the population.

Crime

It is the 58th ranking city in the United States when it comes to violent crime. St. Petersburg ranks in the bottom tenth for safety among cities in Florida. Evidence of the social unrest and the schism within the city, particularly between South St. Petersburg and the rest of the city came with the St. Petersburg, Florida riots of 1996. Police Officer David Crawford was murdered in February 2011 by then-teenager Nicholas Lindsey.

Religion

35.9 percent of St. Petersburg residents consider themselves religious. Catholics make up the largest group at 14 percent followed by Methodists and Baptists, each of which compose of about four percent of the religious community.
The Diocese of St. Petersburg governs 74 Catholic parishes as well as 46 schools and 480,000 Catholics in the Tampa Bay area. Bishop Gregory Parkes currently leads the Diocese of St. Petersburg which covers five counties in the state of Florida.

Economy

Much economic activity is concentrated in the Gateway area, which overlaps St. Petersburg and Pinellas Park. The median household income is $55,134. Health care, retail and professional services are the largest industries. The most common positions in St. Petersburg are Office and Administrative Support, Sales, and Management.

Largest employers

According to the City of St. Petersburg, Florida's 2019 Comprehensive Annual Financial Report, the largest private-sector (non-government, non-school) employers in the city are (with trends since 2010):

Budget

In 2017, the city of St. Petersburg has an operating budget of about $514.1 million.

The Commercial Revitalization Program of 2020 provided grants to commercial developments providing future work to the city. Grants are provided to commercial buildings and developments outside of downtown and are provided as matching grants.

Events

One of the first of many major events of the year that takes place is the Dr. Martin Luther King Jr. Parade, in January. The parade hosts a Battle of the Bands, and drum line extravaganzas that have been duplicated in other cities.

In March the city hosts the annual Firestone Grand Prix of St. Petersburg. This is located in downtown St. Petersburg and is the first round of the IndyCar Series. It usually lasts three days with practice rounds, qualifications, and two main races.

Bluesfest, hosted in the Vinoy Park, hosts multiple live blues artists, offers views of the Tampa Bay waters from the park, and provides drinks and free food.

One of the many art festivals, called the Mainsail Art Festival, is a free entry art exhibition at the Vinoy Park, which offers art sold by local artists. It also provides live music, awards, and food courts.

The Saint Petersburg Art Festival takes place every February.

The downtown triathlon event is hosted by St. Anthony's Hospital and involves a 1.5k swim through Tampa Bay, a 40k bike along the waterways, and a 10k run through the neighborhoods.

The Green Thumb Festival, which originated in 1986 to promote tree beautification and planting in the city of St. Petersburg, is currently held in Walter Fuller Park.

A major event that takes place in June is the St. Pete Pride weekend, when the LGBT community and supporters celebrate in the streets with festivals, the 27/82 concert, and an LGBT pride parade. The weekend also hosts a variety of block parties, food stands, DJ stands, art festivals, local hosted parties, and the LGBT welcoming center.

In July, the 4th of July firework celebration invites the citizens to downtown St. Petersburg.

Greenhouse and USF St. Pete's College of Business host an annual event known as "St. Pete Pitch Night" in October that hosts judges and business pitches.

In November, the annual Ribfest is held at Vinoy Park. It includes family fun zones, drinking vendors, and two stages hosting many country music artists.

SHINE St. Pete Mural Festival is an annual event hosted by the St. Petersburg Arts Alliance. The event began in 2015 and since has contributed to nearly 93 murals designed by artists from across the globe. 2020 marked the first event entirely composed of Florida-based artists, more specifically from the Tampa Bay area.

From the end of November through December are holiday events. A tree lighting ceremony starts the celebrations. The Santa Parade is followed by Snowfest with "glice" skating, toboggan slides, and Kiddyland. Kids meet Santa and ice skate in the North Straub Park. North and South Straub Park are decorated with holiday lights and decorations while the Vinoy Park is decorated with large greeting cards created by the recreational centers in St. Petersburg.

In mid-December, the city hosts an annual NCAA football game in Tropicana Field entitled the St. Petersburg Bowl.

On December 31, St. Petersburg has the year's last event, First Night St. Petersburg, where people celebrate the arts from venues across the city.

The American Stage in the Park hosts many different shows at the Demens Landing Park throughout the year.

St. Petersburg hosted the Miss Florida Pageant eleven consecutive years from 2004 to 2015, until the pageant was moved to Lakeland.

The city hosts a year-round event known as the "Second Saturday ArtWalk".

Demonstrations and protests

Pride month takes place annually throughout the month of June to celebrate and recognize the identities of LGBTQ+ persons. The city of St. Petersburg hosts a variety of events to celebrate Pride Month including the annual Pride Parade.

The annual Women's March in the month of January typically takes place in Williams Park where thousands of individuals gather to march for female rights and equality. The last documented Women's March in St. Pete dates back to 2018 following the resurgence of the #MeToo Movement.

Demonstrations and protests began following the murder of George Floyd to raise awareness of systematic racism and demand social justice.

Tourism

The city has a children's museum (Great Explorations) and a Museum of Fine Arts. Additionally, the Museum of the American Arts and Crafts Movement was expected to open in 2017, but is yet to be opened to the public following delays in breaking ground, construction, and other complications. The St. Petersburg Museum of History has a full-size replica of the Benoist XIV seaplane and is located near the approximate spot by the St. Petersburg Pier where the first scheduled commercial flight departed. St. Petersburg is home to the Dr. Carter G. Woodson African American Museum which highlights the life of Carter G. Woodson who founded the Associated Publishers and is the author of nearly 30 books still prevalent today. Past exhibits and events featured in the museum include the Ray McLendon Exhibit, a discussion of race and politics series, and a seminar on the conviction of Michael Morgan. The city also has the Holocaust Museum, and the Salvador Dalí Museum, which houses the largest collection of Dalí's works outside of Europe, including a number of famous and large-scale paintings such as The Discovery of America by Christopher Columbus. The Chihuly Collection, located on Central Avenue, houses glass sculptures of Dale Chihuly.

There are various other smaller art galleries and entertainment venues, especially in the downtown area, which has seen a boom in development since the mid-1990s; these include the Mahaffey Theater complex, American Stage (an equity regional theater), The Coliseum, Palladium Theatre, the Arts Center, and the Florida Craftsmen Gallery.

There are seven distinct art districts in St. Petersburg. The Deuces Live District is home to the city of St. Petersburg's African American heritage, and includes locally owned art galleries and other specialty businesses, as well as historic buildings such as the Royal Theater. The M.L. King North District includes restaurants and cafes.

The old St. Petersburg Pier was a popular tourist attraction which closed in May 2013, and has been replaced with a new pier that opened in late 2020. The Bounty, a replica of  that was used in the 1962 Technicolor remake of Mutiny on the Bounty, starring Marlon Brando, was permanently docked near the pier for many years until the ship was sold to Ted Turner in 1986. The Bounty, however, sometimes visited St. Petersburg for the winter in the following years before its sinking in 2012. In 2010, the St. Petersburg City Council voted to demolish and rebuild the pier. The new pier will be opening "in phases" in 2020. A ceremony celebrating the opening is scheduled for the 4th of July.

The Moorings partnered with Sailing Florida in Winter of 2020 to begin St. Petersburg's first ever sailing charter. This event took place in response to COVID-19 which restricted travel and left many Americans with the desire to leave their homes. The seven day itinerary takes occupants roundtrip from St. Petersburg to many islands around the Florida area.

The city had a Madame Tussaud Wax Museum between 1963 and 1989.

The downtown Sundial shopping complex opened in May 2014, sitting on the renovated site of a shopping and entertainment complex formerly called BayWalk that originally opened in 2000. It contains a 12-screen movie theater originally owned by Muvico and now owned by AMC Theatres, as well as many chain restaurants and retail shops, catering to a middle- and upper-class audience. The Sundial St. Pete has nightlife destinations, as does the block surrounding Jannus Live. Restaurants serving ethnic and domestic culinary specialties can be found throughout the downtown area.

Every Saturday morning from October to May, the downtown area hosts a farmers' market in the parking area of Al Lang Stadium (formerly Progress Energy Park). Local vendors sell the fruits of their labors (whether edible or decorative) alongside artists of all kinds including live music.

West of downtown on Central Avenue is the 600 Block Arts District, which contains Bohemian art and clothing stores. The eve-N-odd gallery is located in the historic Crislip Arcade built in 1925. The refurbished shopping arcade is one of 13 original city arcades built in the city. Only three are left, and only the Crislip arcade is still being used as a place for small businesses to set up shop. Further west is the Grand Central District located within Historic Kenwood District. It is known for its artistic community, LGBT presence, and the annual St. Pete Pride parade. Haslam's Bookstore can also be found in the Grand Central District. It is the largest independent bookstore in Florida, with over 30,000 square feet. As its name implies, Old Northeast is adjacent to downtown from the northeast. It is known for its historic status and eclectic architecture.

St. Petersburg boasts two historic neighborhoods: Roser Park, located just south of the downtown area, and Grenada Terrace, in the Old Northeast Neighborhood. Both are known for stately architecture, and together comprise the urban core of St. Petersburg.

A bronze statue in honor of St. Pete resident Elder Jordan stands on 22nd Street and Seventh Avenue as of October 2020. Jordan was a slave from birth up until the age of 15 when he bought his freedom and moved to St. Petersburg where he created a successful business.

North of downtown is the Great Explorations Children's Museum, an interactive museum featuring a Children's Village with giant pretend stores, fire house and pet vet clinic, and preschool, science, music, art, and water exhibits. It is located next to Sunken Gardens.

4th Street as a whole, from Downtown up to Gandy Boulevard, is home to many restaurants and bars running the gamut from fast food to haute cuisine. This area is called the "Garden District", although as of 2010 this name is not widely in use.

Boyd Hill Nature Park, located on Lake Maggiore, is a  preserve where one can see many of the endangered plants and rare wildlife of Tampa Bay. A bird exhibit houses bald eagles, owls, hawks, and other species.

The area's main shopping mall is Tyrone Square Mall, constructed in 1972 and is located in the northwestern part of the city.

Cinema

St. Petersburg has been used as a filming location for films over the years, including Once Upon a Time in America (1984), Summer Rental (1985), Cocoon (1985), Ocean's Eleven (2001), Loren Cass (2006), Dolphin Tale (2011), Magic Mike (2012), Spring Breakers (2013), Dolphin Tale 2 (2014), and Miss Peregrine's Home for Peculiar Children (2016).

Bernie the Dolphin (2018) and Garden Party (2019) were filmed around St. Petersburg.

Libraries

The St. Petersburg Library System consists of seven branch locations:
 President Barack Obama Library
 Childs Park Library
 James Weldon Johnson Community Library
 Mirror Lake Library
 North Community Library
 South Community Library
 West Community Library

The Mirror Lake Library, built in 1915, is one of only two Carnegie libraries still operating in Florida.

Sports

The Tampa-St. Petersburg area is represented by teams in four major professional sports (soccer, football, baseball, and hockey). Two teams, the Tampa Bay Rays of Major League Baseball and Tampa Bay Rowdies of the North American Soccer League, play in St. Petersburg proper, while the other two teams play across the bay in Tampa. As their names suggest, all of the teams represent the entire Tampa Bay area and seek to draw fans from both sides of Tampa Bay.

The Tampa-St. Petersburg area hosted the Super Bowl LV, where the Tampa Bay Buccaneers took on the Kansas City Chiefs at Raymond James Stadium on February 7, 2021.

The Rays began play in 1998, finishing last in the American League's East Division in nine of the first ten seasons they played, including their last year known as the "Devil Rays": 2007. In 2008, their 11th season, they held off the Boston Red Sox and won the AL East Division Championship for the first time. In the playoffs, they again faced the Red Sox in the ALCS. They defeated Boston and won the American League Pennant. However, they lost to the Philadelphia Phillies in the 2008 World Series. The Rays also made an appearance in the 2020 World Series where they faced the Los Angeles Dodgers.

From their inception until 2008, the Rays played their regular season games at Tropicana Field and their spring training games at historic Al Lang Stadium, formerly Progress Energy Park, giving them the unique distinction of being the only team in Major League Baseball that played its spring training games in their home city in more than 70 years. Beginning in 2009, the Rays have held spring training at Charlotte Sports Park in Port Charlotte, ending a 94-year streak of springtime baseball in the city. Tropicana Field, the home venue of the Rays, played host to the 1999 Final Four. Despite not having a team in the city since 2000 (with the St. Petersburg Devil Rays), St. Petersburg is home to Minor League Baseball's main headquarters.

St. Petersburg is home to the Grand Prix of St. Petersburg, the inaugural race was held in April 2005. The circuit itself is made of downtown streets passing Al Lang Stadium, the marina, and a runway in Albert Whitted Airport, and streets are temporarily blocked off for the annual Indy Racing League's IndyCar Series race. The race was postponed in 2020 due to the spread of the COVID-19 coronavirus, and was rescheduled as the final race of the season, rather than the first race. In 2012, the road intersecting Turn 10 was renamed Dan Wheldon Way in memory of Dan Wheldon, who won the 2005 race thanks to a move made on that turn. Wheldon was killed in an accident at the Las Vegas Motor Speedway in the 2011 season finale.

The Tampa Bay Rowdies of the United Soccer League began play in Tampa in 2010 and moved to Al Lang Stadium in 2011. The long-time baseball venue is named after Al Lang, a former mayor of St. Petersburg who was instrumental in bringing spring training to the city in 1914. The Rowdies initially shared Al Lang Stadium with various amateur baseball events, but eventually took over operation of the facility and has converted it into a soccer-only facility The Rowdies' ownership has expressed interest in moving up to join Major League Soccer (MLS) and a 2016 referendum gave the club permission to build a larger privately funded stadium at the site of Al Lang Stadium if the move takes place.

The Bay Area Pelicans Rugby Football Club has made their home in St. Petersburg since 1977.

Government

The city of St. Petersburg has been governed under a strong mayor form of government since 1993. The Mayor of St. Petersburg and the St. Petersburg City Council members are elected to a four-year term, limited to two consecutive terms. Currently the mayor of St. Petersburg is Ken Welch who took office on January 6, 2022. The legislative body consists of eight City Council members representing each of their designated city districts.

St. Petersburg is in Florida's 13th congressional district and is represented in Congress by Democrat Charlie Crist. In 2020, 49.58 percent of Pinellas County voters cast ballots for Democratic candidate and the 46th President Joe Biden.

Education

Primary and secondary education

Public primary and secondary schools in St. Petersburg are administered by Pinellas County Schools. Public high schools within the city limits include:
 Gibbs High School
 Lakewood High School
 Northeast High School
 St. Petersburg High School
 St. Petersburg Collegiate High School

Private high schools include:
 Canterbury School of Florida
 St. Petersburg Catholic High School
 Shorecrest Preparatory School
 Admiral Farragut Academy

High schools located in unincorporated (outside city limits) St. Petersburg:
 Dixie M. Hollins High School
 Keswick Christian School
 Northside Christian School

The non-profit Science Center of Pinellas County educates more than 22,000 school children annually through field trip classes and offers winter, spring and summer workshops for 2,000 more.

Higher education

St. Petersburg is home to several institutions of higher education. The University of South Florida St. Petersburg is an autonomous campus in the University of South Florida system. The University of South Florida St. Petersburg serves 6,500 students. Eckerd College, founded in 1958, is a private four-year liberal arts college. St. Petersburg College is a state college in the Florida College System. Also in St. Petersburg is the Poynter Institute, a journalism institute which owns the Tampa Bay Times in a unique arrangement. Stetson Law School is located in Gulfport, which is adjacent to St. Petersburg between the south beaches.

Other colleges and universities in the wider Tampa Bay Area include the University of South Florida and the University of Tampa located in Tampa and Hillsborough Community College, with campuses across Hillsborough County.

St. Petersburg College, founded in 1927, a state college within the Florida College System. It has an average of 65,000 students spread across 11 campuses and centers in the Bay area, four of which are in St. Petersburg.

Media

The city's main daily morning newspaper is the Tampa Bay Times as well as its free weekly sister publication tbt*. The free weekly alternative newspaper Creative Loafing is also available in the area.

Cable television service is provided by Spectrum (previously Bright House Networks) and Wide Open West (abbreviated "WOW!", previously Knology), as well as fiber optic service provider Frontier Communications (previously Verizon FiOS).

St. Petersburg is in the Tampa-St. Petersburg television and radio markets. WTSP channel 10 (CBS) and WTOG channel 44 (The CW) are licensed to St. Petersburg, with studios in unincorporated Pinellas County in the Gandy Boulevard area just north of the St. Petersburg limits. Spectrum Bay News 9, the local cable TV news service, is based in northeast St. Petersburg. Independent station WTTA is licensed to St. Petersburg, with studios in Tampa. Official city government programming, known as StPeteTV, can be found on Spectrum on Channel 641, WOW! Cable on Channel 15 or Frontier Channel 20 as well as online. City government programming previously aired on city-owned WSPF-CD channel 35 until 2012, when the city sold the station to private interests.

Infrastructure

Transportation

Roads

The city is connected to Tampa by the east by causeways and bridges across Tampa Bay, and to Bradenton in the south by the Sunshine Skyway Bridge (Interstate 275), which traverses the mouth of the bay. Travel Channel named the Skyway Bridge one of the top 10 Best Bridges in the World. It is also served by Interstates 175 and 375, which branch off I-275 into the southern and northern areas of downtown respectively. The Gandy Bridge, conceived by George Gandy and opened in 1924, was the first causeway to be built across Tampa Bay, connecting St. Petersburg and Tampa cities without a circuitous  trip around the bay through Oldsmar.

Airports

Nearby Tampa International Airport provides air transportation for most passengers. Smaller airlines, with destinations to smaller cities and towns, operate at St. Petersburg-Clearwater International Airport, with most tenants providing only seasonal services. Albert Whitted Airport provides general aviation services near the heart of downtown St. Petersburg.

Mass transit

Mass transit in St. Petersburg is provided by the Pinellas Suncoast Transit Authority (PSTA). A sightseeing trolley, called The Looper, also travels to key downtown destinations daily such as USFSP, Sundial, Vinoy Hotel, and the multiple museums around the city. Short-term bike sharing is also offered via Coast Bike Share.

In 2022, PSTA launched the SunRunner, a bus rapid transit service connecting downtown St. Petersburg to St. Pete Beach. The SunRunner is the first bus rapid transit line in the Tampa Bay Area and is expected to spur economic development along the Central Avenue corridor in Pinellas County. In its first weekend alone, the SunRunner had over 10,000 passengers.

Railroads

CSX Transportation operates a former Atlantic Coast Line Railroad branch line which sees daily rail traffic from north Tampa though Safety Harbor, Clearwater, and Largo. As of March 2008, the portion that ran into downtown St. Petersburg and the adjacent western industrial areas was abandoned. There is a small rail yard to the northwest of downtown St. Petersburg at the new end of the rail line with several spur lines serving industries in the area.

The former Seaboard Air Line branch from the western coastal portion of the county was abandoned in the 1980s and converted to a popular recreational trail called the Pinellas Trail.

Notable former stations include the St. Petersburg ACL station, which became an Amtrak station from 1971 to 1983, St. Petersburg Seaboard Air Line Passenger Station, and the St. Petersburg Seaboard Coast Line station.

Port and marinas

One of the main sea transportation areas in St. Petersburg is the Port of St. Petersburg, which is located in downtown St. Petersburg. Boat marinas in downtown St. Petersburg are also available such as the Municipal Marina which located in the Southern and Central Yacht Basins, and Harborage Marina located in the Bayboro Harbor.

Utilities

The city of St. Petersburg's major electricity system is provided by Duke Energy, the city's major gas system is provided by TECO Energy in the industrial and commercial parts of the city, and the city's water services are provided by the city of St. Petersburg.

International relations

Sister cities

The city of St. Petersburg, Florida is currently a member in the Sister Cities International group that was created in 1956.
  Takamatsu, Kagawa, Japan (since 1961)
  Isla Mujeres, Quintana Roo, Mexico (since 2016)
Every year, the city of St Pete sponsors three high school students to do a summer exchange with Takamatsu, Japan.

Twin cities

  Saint Petersburg, Russia
  Figueres, Catalonia, Spain (since 2011)

See also

 Largest metropolitan areas in the Americas
 United States cities by population
 Tallest buildings in St. Petersburg, Florida
 List of parks in St. Petersburg, Florida
 Mayoral elections in St. Petersburg, 2017
 St. Petersburg Bar Association
 List of people from St. Petersburg, Florida

References

Bibliography

External links

 
 St. Petersburg Public Library System
 Pinellas County Geographic Information System
 Downtown St. Petersburg Entertainment Guide
 Downtown Waterfront Master Plan 
 Earl R. Jacobs III Collection of Francis G. Wagner St. Petersburg Photographs at the University of South Florida
 

 
Cities in Florida
Cities in Pinellas County, Florida
Populated places on the Intracoastal Waterway in Florida
Populated places on Tampa Bay
Populated places established in 1876
Port cities and towns of the Florida Gulf coast
1876 establishments in Florida